Martine Broda ( in Nancy –  in Paris) was a French poet, literary critic and translator.

Biography 
After studying literature and philosophy at the same time, Martie Broda has manly devoted herself to poetry, being part of the collective from the journal Action Poétique, and at the time of research at CNRS, her work focused on modern poetry. Beyond of her own poetic creations, she particularly known for her translations and commentary on the poetry of Paul Celan.

She is buried in Montparnasse Cemetery.

Works

Poetry 
Éblouissements. Flammarion, 2003.
Poèmes d'été. Flammarion, 2000.
Huit Pages, about the Shoah in Robert Antelme. Gallimard, 1996.
Poèmes d'Éblouissements in 29 femmes: une anthologie. Stock, 1994.
Grand jour. Belin, 1994.
Ce recommencement. Unes, 1992. (With Frédéric Benrath) 
Passage. Lettres de Casse, 1985.
Tout ange est terrible. Clivages, 1983. (With André Marfaing)
Double. La Répétition, 1978. (With Gisèle Celan-Lestrange)

Translations 

 Paul Celan La Rose de personne / Die Niemandsrose, bilingual edition, Paris, Le Nouveau Commerce 1979. New edition, Paris, José Corti, 2002.
 Paul Celan Grille de parole, Paris, Christian Bourgois, 1991.
 Paul Celan  Enclos du temps, Paris, Clivages, 1985.
 Nelly Sachs  Énigmes en feu, in Eli, lettres, Énigmes en feu, Paris, Belin, 1989.
 Nelly Sachs Celle qui se met en quête, in Po&sie, no 69, Paris, Belin, 1994.
 T. S. Eliot East Coker, in Europe, no 830–831, June–July 1998.
 Walter Benjamin La Tâche du traducteur, dans Po&sie, no 55, Paris, Belin, 1991, p. 150-158.

Essays 

 For Roberto Juarroz, Paris, José Corti, 2002.
 L'amour du nom, essay on lyricism and amorous lyric, Paris, José Corti, 1997 (Prix Mottart of the Académie française 1998)
 Dans la main de personne. Essay on Paul Celan, Paris, Cerf, coll. « La Nuit surveillée », 1986 ; then expanded reissue, Paris, Cerf, 2002
 Jouve, Paris, L'Âge d'homme et Cistre, 1981.

External links
 Hommage at the  website
 Plusieurs poèmes ("More poems") by Martine Broda at the Terres de femmes ("Women's Worlds") blog
 Un poème, a poem by Martine Broda at Jean-Michel Maulpoix's website
 L'Amour du nom at José Corti's website
''

1947 births
2009 deaths
Translators from German
Translators to French
20th-century French poets
20th-century French women writers
20th-century French translators